Akhtang is a shield volcano topped by a small basaltic stratovolcano located in the Sredinny Range on the Kamchatka Peninsula, Russia southeast of the Ichinsky volcano.

See also
List of volcanoes in Russia

References

Mountains of the Kamchatka Peninsula
Volcanoes of the Kamchatka Peninsula
Stratovolcanoes of Russia
Pleistocene stratovolcanoes
Pleistocene Asia
Shield volcanoes of Russia
Pleistocene shield volcanoes